Buza is a commune in Cluj County, Transylvania, Romania. It is composed of two villages, Buza and Rotunda (Buzapuszta).

Demographics

According to the 2011 census, Romanians made up 47.8% of the population, Hungarians made up 46.1% and Roma made up 4.0%.

References

Communes in Cluj County
Localities in Transylvania